Regency Council may refer to:

 Regency Council (Iran)
 Regency Council (Poland)